Metal of Honor: The Ironworkers of 9/11 is a documentary film about the ironworkers who worked on the World Trade Center after the September 11 attacks. It premiered on Spike TV on September 5, 2006.

External links

New York Times Review
Linda Stasi, "Men of Steel", New York Post (August 10, 2006)
Excerpt of the film at Yahoo Video

2006 television films
2006 films
American documentary films
Documentary films about the September 11 attacks
2000s American films